Mounce is a surname, and may refer to:

 Lewis Alfred Mounce (1857–1935), Canadian lumberman and politician
 Robert H. Mounce (born 1921), American New Testament scholar, father of William D. Mounce
 Tony Mounce (born 1975), American Major League Baseball pitcher
 William D. Mounce (born 1953), American New Testament Greek scholar, son of Robert H. Mounce